Fernando Ismael Fernandes Pimenta  (born 13 August 1989) is a Portuguese sprint canoeist who has won multiple medals at the Olympic Games, World and European championships. At club level, he represents Benfica.

Career
Pimenta has competed since the late 2000s. His first major result came at the 2010 World Championships in Poznań, Poland, when he won the K-2 500 metres silver medal together with João Ribeiro. One year later, he contributed to the Portuguese K-4 1000 metres gold medal at the European Championships in Belgrade, Serbia, and claimed a bronze in the K-1 1000 metres. Together with Emanuel Silva, he won the silver medal in the K-2 1000 metres event at the 2012 Summer Olympics in London, which was Portugal's only medal at these Games.

In 2013, Pimenta won multiple medals in international events, namely two silvers (K-1 5000 metres and K-4 1000 metres) at the European Championships, held in Portugal's Montemor-o-Velho racing course, and two golds (K-1 500 and 1000 metres) at the Summer Universiade in Kazan. The following year, he secured his second world championship medal in Moscow, after a runner-up finish in the K-4 1000 metres event. At the European Championships in Brandenburg, Germany, Pimenta finished again in the top-three places of the K-1 5000 and K-4 1000 metres, taking a bronze medal in both events.

Pimenta participated in the inaugural edition of the European Games, in Baku, Azerbaijan, where he became the first Portuguese sprint canoeist to win a medal in this competition, after finishing second in the K-1 1000 metres event; a day later, he added another silver medal in the K-1 5000 metres. At the World Championships in Milan, Pimenta won the K-1 1000 metres bronze medal – his third medal at this level – and secured his country's qualification for this event at the 2016 Summer Olympics in Rio de Janeiro.

In 2016, Pimenta won his first individual continental titles after taking the K-1 1000 and 5000 metres gold medals at the European Championships in Moscow. At the Olympics, he missed the medal places, finishing 5th and 6th in the K-1 1000 metres and K-4 1000 metres finals, respectively. The following year in July, he defended his European K-1 1000 metres title in Plovdiv, but lost the K-1 5000 metres crown to his German rival Max Hoff. However, the following month, Pimenta would beat Hoff in a sprint finish for the K-1 5000 metres gold medal at the World Championships in Račice, to win his first individual world title. On 5 March 2018, he moved from Clube Náutico de Ponte de Lima to S.L. Benfica.

At the 2020 Tokyo Olympics, Pimenta won his heat, earning direct access to the semi-final which he also won with an Olympic Record. During the 3 August 2021 final, Pimenta won the bronze medal with faster time than in the previous round.

Orders
 Grand Officer of the Order of Prince Henry
 Commander of the Order of Merit

References

External links
 

Fernando Pimenta at the Olympic Committee of Portugal
Fernando Pimenta at the Portuguese Canoeing Federation

1989 births
Living people
People from Ponte de Lima
Portuguese male canoeists
Commanders of the Order of Merit (Portugal)
Olympic canoeists of Portugal
Olympic silver medalists for Portugal
Olympic bronze medalists for Portugal
Olympic medalists in canoeing
Canoeists at the 2012 Summer Olympics
Medalists at the 2012 Summer Olympics
Canoeists at the 2016 Summer Olympics
Canoeists at the 2020 Summer Olympics
Medalists at the 2020 Summer Olympics
European Games silver medalists for Portugal
European Games medalists in canoeing
Canoeists at the 2015 European Games
ICF Canoe Sprint World Championships medalists in kayak
Medalists at the ICF Canoe Marathon World Championships
Competitors at the 2018 Mediterranean Games
Mediterranean Games silver medalists for Portugal
S.L. Benfica (canoeing)
Mediterranean Games medalists in canoeing
Canoeists at the 2019 European Games
Golden Globes (Portugal) winners
Universiade medalists in canoeing
Universiade gold medalists for Portugal
Medalists at the 2013 Summer Universiade
Sportspeople from Viana do Castelo District